James Francis Hoyt (May 16, 1925 – August 11, 2008) was one of the four American soldiers who discovered the Buchenwald concentration camp. According to military records, Hoyt, then a private first class, was part of a group of four members of the 6th Armored Division, who were the first Americans to discover Buchenwald on April 11, 1945.

References

External links
 James Hoyt, 83, Iowa City Press-Citizen

1925 births
2008 deaths
People from Johnson County, Iowa
Military personnel from Iowa
United States Army personnel of World War II
Buchenwald concentration camp
United States Army soldiers